Mountaineering, mountain climbing, or alpinism, is a set of outdoor activities that involves ascending mountains. Mountaineering-related activities include traditional outdoor climbing, skiing, and traversing via ferratas that have become sports in their own right. Indoor climbing, sport climbing, and bouldering are also considered variants of mountaineering by some, but are part of a wide group of mountain sports.

Unlike most sports, mountaineering lacks widely applied formal rules, regulations, and governance; mountaineers adhere to a large variety of techniques and philosophies when climbing mountains. Numerous local alpine clubs support mountaineers by hosting resources and social activities. A federation of alpine clubs, the International Climbing and Mountaineering Federation (UIAA), is the International Olympic Committee-recognized world organization for mountaineering and climbing.
The consequences of mountaineering on the natural environment can be seen in terms of individual components of the environment (land relief, soil, vegetation, fauna, and landscape) and location/zone of mountaineering activity (hiking, trekking, or climbing zone). Mountaineering impacts communities on economic, political, social and cultural levels, often leading to changes in people's worldviews influenced by globalization, specifically foreign cultures and lifestyles.

History

Early mountaineering
Humans have been present in mountains since prehistory. The remains of Ötzi, who lived in the 4th millennium BC, were found in a glacier in the Ötztal Alps. However, the highest mountains were rarely visited early on, and were often associated with supernatural or religious concepts. Nonetheless, there are many documented examples of people climbing mountains prior to the formal development of the sport in the 19th century, although many of these stories are sometimes considered fictional or legendary.

The famous poet Petrarch describes his 26 April 1336 ascent of Mount Ventoux in one of his epistolae familiares, claiming to be inspired by Philip V of Macedon's ascent of Mount Haemo.

For most of antiquity, climbing mountains was a practical or symbolic activity, usually undertaken for economic, political, or religious purposes. A commonly cited example is the 1492 ascent of Mont Aiguille by Antoine de Ville, a French military officer and lord of Domjulien and Beaupré.

In the Andes, around the late 1400s and early 1500s many ascents were made of extremely high peaks  by the Incas and their subjects. The highest they are known for certain to have climbed is 6739 m at the summit of Volcan Llullaillaco.

The Enlightenment and the Golden Age of Alpinism

The Age of Enlightenment and the Romantic era marked a change of attitudes towards high mountains. In 1757 Swiss scientist Horace-Bénédict de Saussure made the first of several unsuccessful attempts on Mont Blanc in France. He then offered a reward to anyone who could climb the mountain, which was claimed in 1786 by Jacques Balmat and Michel-Gabriel Paccard. The climb is usually considered an epochal event in the history of mountaineering, a symbolic mark of the birth of the sport.

By the early 19th century, many of the alpine peaks were reached, including the Grossglockner in 1800, the Ortler in 1804, the Jungfrau in 1811, the Finsteraarhorn in 1812, and the Breithorn in 1813. In 1808, Marie Paradis became the first woman to climb Mont Blanc, followed in 1838 by Henriette d'Angeville.

The beginning of mountaineering as a sport in the UK is generally dated to the ascent of the Wetterhorn in 1854 by English mountaineer Sir Alfred Wills, who made mountaineering fashionable in Britain. This inaugurated what became known as the Golden Age of Alpinism, with the first mountaineering club – the Alpine Club – being founded in 1857.

One of the most dramatic events was the spectacular first ascent of the Matterhorn in 1865 by a party led by English illustrator Edward Whymper, in which four of the party members fell to their deaths. By this point the sport of mountaineering had largely reached its modern form, with a large body of professional guides, equipment, and methodologies.

In the early years of the "golden age", scientific pursuits were intermixed with the sport, such as by the physicist John Tyndall. In the later years, it shifted to a more competitive orientation as pure sportsmen came to dominate the London-based Alpine Club and alpine mountaineering overall. The first president of the Alpine Club, John Ball, is considered to be the discoverer of the Dolomites, which for decades were the focus of climbers like Paul Grohmann and Angelo Dibona. At that time, the edelweiss also established itself as a symbol of alpinists and mountaineers.

Expansion around the world
In the 19th century, the focus of mountaineering turned towards mountains beyond the Alps, and by the turn of the 20th century, mountaineering had acquired a more international flavour.

In 1897 Mount Saint Elias on the Alaska-Yukon border was summitted by the Duke of the Abruzzi and party. In 1879–1880 the exploration of the highest Andes in South America began when English mountaineer Edward Whymper climbed Chimborazo and explored the mountains of Ecuador. It took until the late 19th century for European explorers to penetrate Africa. Mount Kilimanjaro in Africa was climbed in 1889 by Austrian mountaineer Ludwig Purtscheller and German geologist Hans Meyer, Mount Kenya in 1899 by Halford Mackinder.

The last frontier: The Himalayas

The last and greatest mountain range was the Himalayas in South Asia. They had initially been surveyed by the British Empire for military and strategic reasons. In 1895 Albert F. Mummery died while attempting Nanga Parbat, while in 1899 Douglas Freshfield took an expedition to the snowy regions of Sikkim.

In 1899, 1903, 1906, and 1908 American mountaineer Fanny Bullock Workman (one of the first professional female mountaineers) made ascents in the Himalayas, including one of the Nun Kun peaks. A number of Gurkha sepoys were trained as expert mountaineers by Charles Granville Bruce, and a good deal of exploration was accomplished by them.

In 1902 the Eckenstein–Crowley Expedition, led by English mountaineer Oscar Eckenstein and English occultist Aleister Crowley was the first to attempt to scale K2. They reached  before turning back due to weather and other mishaps. Undaunted, in 1905 Crowley led the first expedition to Kangchenjunga, the third highest mountain in the world, in an attempt described as "misguided" and "lamentable".

Eckenstein was also a pioneer in developing new equipment and climbing methods. He started using shorter ice axes which could be used single-handed, designed the modern crampons and improved on the nail patterns used for the climbing boots.

By the 1950s, all the eight-thousanders but two had been climbed starting with Annapurna in 1950 by Maurice Herzog and Louis Lachenal on the 1950 French Annapurna expedition. The highest of these peaks Mount Everest was climbed in 1953 after the British had made several attempts in the 1920s; the 1922 expedition reached  before being aborted on the third summit attempt after an avalanche killed seven porters. The 1924 expedition saw another height record achieved but still failed to reach the summit with confirmation when George Mallory and Andrew Irvine disappeared on the final attempt. The summit was finally reached on 29 May 1953 by Sir Edmund Hillary and Tenzing Norgay from the south side in Nepal.

Just a few months later, Hermann Buhl made the first ascent of Nanga Parbat (8,125 m), on the 1953 German–Austrian Nanga Parbat expedition, a  expedition culminating in a last 1,300 meters walking alone, being under the influence of drugs: pervitin (based on the stimulant methamphetamine used by soldiers during World War II), padutin and tea from coca leaves. K2 (8,611 m), the second-highest peak in the world, was first scaled in 1954 by Lino Lacedelli and Achille Compagnoni. In 1964, the final eight-thousander to be climbed was Shishapangma (8,013 m), the lowest of all the 8,000-metre peaks.
Reinhold Messner from the Dolomites mountain range (Italy) was then the first to climb all eight-thousanders up to 1986, in addition to be the first without supplemental oxygen. In 1978 he climbed Mount Everest with Peter Habeler without supplemental oxygen, the first men to do so.

Today
Long the domain of the wealthy elite and their agents, the emergence of the middle-class in the 19th and 20th centuries resulted in mass interest in mountaineering. It became a popular pastime and hobby of many people. Some have come to criticize the sport as becoming too much of a tourist activity.

Organisation

Activities
There are different activities associated with the sport.
 Traditional mountaineering involves identifying a specific mountain and route to climb, and executing the plan by whatever means appropriate. A mountain summit is almost always the goal. This activity is strongly associated with aid climbing and free climbing, as well as the use of ice axe and crampons on glaciers and similar terrain.
 Ski mountaineering involves skiing on mountainous terrain, usually in terrain much more rugged than typical cross-country skiing. Unlike traditional mountaineering, routes are less well-defined and summiting may not be the main goal.
 Peak bagging is the general activity of ascending peaks that are on a list of notable mountains, such as the 4000m peaks of the Alps.
 Enchainment is climbing more than one significant summit in one outing, usually on the same day.
 Climbing via ferratas involves traversing ladder-like paths on highly exposed terrain.
 Ice climbing which involves proceeding on steep sections of blank ice with crampons and ice axes. This activity often requires progressing on steep and blank sections of ice. Most mountaineers have to rely on ice climbing skills to climb upon the higher peaks in the European Alps, Himalayas and Canadian ranges.

Rules and governance
Mountaineering lacks formal rules; in theory, any person may climb a mountain and call themself a mountaineer. In practice, the sport is defined by the safe and necessary use of technical skills in mountainous terrain: in particular, roped climbing and snow travel abilities. A variety of techniques have been developed to help people climb mountains that are widely applied among practitioners of the sport.

Despite its lack of defined rules and non-competitive nature, mountaineering has much of the trappings of an organized sport, with recognition by the International Olympic Committee and a prominent international sport federation, the UIAA, which counts numerous national alpine clubs as its members. There are also many notable mountaineering/alpine clubs unassociated with the UIAA, such as The Mountaineers and the French Federation of Mountaineering and Climbing.

The premier award in mountaineering is the Piolet d'Or. There are no "world championships" or other similar competitions for mountaineering.

Terrain and techniques

Mountaineering techniques vary greatly depending on location, season, and the particular route a mountaineer chooses to climb. Mountaineers train to climb on all types of terrain whether it be level ground, rock, snow, or ice. Each type of terrain presents its own hazards. Mountaineers must possess adequate food, water, information, equipment and stamina to complete their tasks.

See also: Grade (climbing)

Walk-up terrain
The term "walk-up" or "trek" is used to describe terrain in which no technical equipment is needed. To traverse this terrain, mountaineers hike long distances to a base camp or the beginning of rough terrain, either following trails or using navigation techniques to travel cross-country. Hiking may be a strenuous activity, and adequate physical fitness and familiarity with the wilderness is necessary to complete a hike; it is also a prerequisite of success in all aspects of mountaineering.

Rock
Alpine rock climbing involves technical skills including the ability to place anchors into the rock to safely ascend a mountain. In some cases, climbers may have to climb multiple pitches of rock to reach the top. Typically, for any one pitch, there is a belayer who is stationary and creates tension on the rope to catch a climber should he or she fall, and a climber who ascends the rock. The first climber, called the leader, will reach a point on the rock and then build an anchor, which will secure subsequent climbers. Anchors could be created by using slings around a tree or boulder, or by using protection devices like cams and nuts.

Once anchored, the leader will then belay the climber coming up from below. Once the follower reaches the leader, the leader will often transfer all necessary protection devices (known as a rack) to the follower. The follower then becomes the leader and will ascend the next pitch. This process will continue until the climbers either reach the top, or run into different terrain.

For extremely vertical rocks, or to overcome certain logistical challenges, climbers may use aid climbing techniques. This involves the use of equipment, such as ladders, fixed lines, and ascenders to help the climber push themself up the rock.

In alpine climbing, it is common for climbers to see routes of mixed terrain. This means climbers may need to move efficiently from climbing glacier, to rock, to ice, back and forth in a number of variations.

Snow and ice

Compacted snow conditions allow mountaineers to progress on foot. Frequently crampons are required to travel efficiently and safely over snow and ice. Crampons attach to the bottom of a mountaineer's boots and provide additional traction on hard snow and ice. For loose snow, crampons are less suitable, and snowshoes or skis may be preferred. Using various techniques from alpine skiing to ascend/descend a mountain is a form of the sport by itself, called ski mountaineering.

Ascending and descending a steep snow slope safely requires the use of an ice axe and different footwork techniques that have been developed over the past century, such as the French technique and German technique. Teams of climbers may choose to attach everyone together with a rope, to form a rope team. The team may then secure themselves by attaching the rope to anchors. These anchors are sometimes unreliable, and include snow stakes or pickets, deadman devices called flukes, or buried equipment or rocks. Bollards, which are simply carved out of consolidated snow or ice, also sometimes serve as anchors. Alternatively, a roped team may choose not to use anchors; instead all members of the team will prepare to use their ice axes to self-arrest in the event should a team member fall.

It is not always wise for climbers to form a rope team, since one falling climber may pull the entire team off the mountain. However, the risks of individual, unprotected travel are often so great that groups have no choice but to form a rope team.

For example, when travelling over glaciers, crevasses pose a grave danger to a climber who is not roped in. These giant cracks in the ice are not always visible as snow can be blown and freeze over the top to make a snowbridge. At times snowbridges can be as thin as a few inches, and may collapse from people walking over them. Should a climber fall, being protected by a rope greatly reduces the risk of injury or death. The other members of the rope team may proceed with a crevasse rescue to pull the fallen climber from the crevasse.

For extremely slippery or steep snow, ice, and mixed rock and ice terrain climbers must use more advanced techniques, called ice climbing or mixed climbing. Specialized tools such as ice screws and ice picks help climbers build anchors and move up the ice, as well as traditional rock climbing equipment for anchoring in mixed terrain. Often, mountaineers climbing steep snow or mixed snowy rock terrain will not use a fixed belay. Instead each climber on the team will climb at the same time while attached to anchors, in groups of two. This allows for safety should the entire team be taken off their feet which also allowing for greater speed than the traditional technique of belaying one climber at a time. This technique is known as simul-climbing or a running belay and is sometimes also used on ice, however the risk of dropping frequently displaced ice on the lower team member(s) limits its usefulness on ice. Traditional belays are also used; in this case, this is sometimes necessary due to ice fall hazard, steepness, or other factors.

Shelter 

Climbers use a few different forms of shelter depending on the situation and conditions; alpine shelters or arctic shelters. Shelter is a very important aspect of safety for the climber as weather in the mountains may be very unpredictable. Tall mountains may require many days of camping.

Short trips lasting less than a day generally do not require shelter, although for safety, most mountaineers will carry an emergency shelter, such a light bivouac sack.

Camping
Typical shelters used for camping include tents and bivouac sacks. The ability of these shelters to provide protection from the elements is dependent on their design. Mountaineers who climb in areas with cold weather or snow and ice will use more heavy-duty shelters than those who climb in more forgiving environments.

In remote locations, mountaineers will set up a "base camp", which is an area used for staging attempts at nearby summits. Base camps are positioned to be relatively safe from harsh terrain and weather. Where the summit cannot be reached from base camp in a single day, a mountain will have additional camps above base camp. For popular mountains, base camps may be at a fixed location and become famous. The Everest base camps and Camp Muir are among the most famous base camps.

Hut

Camping is not always an option, or may not be suitable if a mountain is close to civilization. Some regions may legally prohibit primitive camping due to concern for the environment, or due to issues with crowds. In lieu of camping, mountaineers may choose to stay in mountain huts.

The European alpine regions, in particular, have a large network of huts. Such huts exist at many different heights, including in the high mountains themselves – in extremely remote areas, more rudimentary shelters may exist. The mountain huts are of varying size and quality, but each is typically centred on a communal dining room and have dormitories equipped with mattresses, blankets or duvets, and pillows; guests are expected to bring and use their own sleeping bag liners. The facilities are usually rudimentary, but, given their locations, huts offer vital shelter, make routes more widely accessible (by allowing journeys to be broken and reducing the weight of equipment needing to be carried), and offer good value. In Europe, all huts are staffed during the summer (mid-June to mid-September) and some are staffed in the spring (mid-March to mid-May). Elsewhere, huts may also be open in the fall. Huts also may have a part that is always open, but unmanned, a so-called winter hut.

When open and manned, the huts are generally run by full-time employees, but some are staffed on a voluntary basis by members of alpine clubs. The manager of the hut, termed a guardian or warden in Europe, will usually also sell refreshments and meals, both to those visiting only for the day and to those staying overnight. The offering is surprisingly wide, given that most supplies, often including fresh water, must be flown in by helicopter, and may include glucose-based snacks (such as candy bars) on which climbers and walkers wish to stock up, cakes and pastries made at the hut, a variety of hot and cold drinks (including beer and wine), and high carbohydrate dinners in the evenings. Not all huts offer a catered service, though, and visitors may need to provide for themselves. Some huts offer facilities for both, enabling visitors wishing to keep costs down to bring their own food and cooking equipment and to cater using the facilities provided. Booking for overnight stays at huts is deemed obligatory, and in many cases is essential as some popular huts, even with more than 100 bed spaces, may be full during good weather and at weekends. Once made, the cancellation of a reservation is advised as a matter of courtesy – and, indeed, potentially of safety, as many huts keep a record of where climbers and walkers state they plan to walk to next. Most huts may be contacted by telephone and most take credit cards as a means of payment.

In the UK the term "hut" is used for any cottage or cabin used as a base for walkers or climbers. These are mostly owned by mountaineering clubs for use by members or visiting clubs and generally do not have wardens or permanent staff, but have cooking and washing facilities and heating. In the Scottish Highlands small simple unmanned shelters without cooking facilities known as "bothies" are maintained to break up cross country long routes and act as base camps to certain mountains.

Snow cave
Where conditions permit, snow caves are another way to shelter high on the mountain. Some climbers do not use tents at high altitudes unless the snow conditions do not allow for snow caving, since snow caves are silent and much warmer than tents. They can be built relatively easily, given sufficient time, using a snow shovel. The temperature of a correctly made snow cave will hover around freezing, which relative to outside temperatures can be very warm. They can be dug anywhere where there is at least four feet of snow. The addition of a good quality bivouac bag and closed cell foam sleeping mat will also increase the warmth of the snow cave. Another shelter that works well is a quinzee, which is excavated from a pile of snow that has been work hardened or sintered (typically by stomping). Igloos are used by some climbers, but are deceptively difficult to build and require specific snow conditions.

Safety and Hazards

Mountaineers face a variety of hazards. When climbing mountains, there are two types of hazards, objective (mountain-based) and subjective (human-based). Objective hazards relate to the environment, and may include inclement weather conditions, dangerous terrain, duration of exposure, and other environmental conditions. Subjective hazards relate to a climber's poor judgement, poor planning, lack of skills, faulty analysis and conclusions, or inadequate conditioning. 

In terms of objective hazards, the dangers mountaineers face include loose or falling rocks, falling ice, snow-avalanches, the climber falling, falls from ice slopes, falls down snow slopes, falls into crevasses, and the dangers from altitude and weather.

From 1947 to 2018 in the United States "2,799 people were reported to be involved in mountaineering accidents and 43% of these accidents resulted in death." Climbers themselves are responsible for nearly all climbing accidents.

When planning and preparing for a trip, safe climbers know what hazards to look for and how to recognize them. In situations where hazards are not able to be avoided, the climber must use their decision-making skills to mitigate those hazards. Climbers improve upon their ability to become a safe decision maker and recognize hazards by receiving proper education, training, practice, and experience as well as learning how to spot personal bias.

Altitude
Rapid ascent can lead to altitude sickness. The best treatment is to descend immediately. The climber's motto at high altitude is "climb high, sleep low", referring to the regimen of climbing higher to acclimatise but returning to lower elevation to sleep. In the Andes, the chewing of coca leaves has been traditionally used to treat altitude sickness symptoms.

Common symptoms of altitude sickness include severe headache, sleep problems, nausea, lack of appetite, lethargy and body ache. Mountain sickness may progress to HACE (High altitude cerebral edema) and HAPE (High altitude pulmonary edema), both of which can be fatal within 24 hours.

In high mountains, atmospheric pressure is lower and this means that less oxygen is available to breathe. This is the underlying cause of altitude sickness. Everyone needs to acclimatise, even exceptional mountaineers that have been to high altitude before. Generally speaking, mountaineers start using bottled oxygen when they climb above 7,000 m. Exceptional mountaineers have climbed 8000-metre peaks (including Everest) without oxygen, almost always with a carefully planned program of acclimatisation.

Heat Related Conditions 
Exposure to hot environments or activities involving exertion cause heat to build up in the body. A heat related illness can occur when the body is unable to lose that built up heat through the skin.

Problems that can arise from this type of exposure include heat cramps, heat exhaustion, and heat stroke. Common symptoms of heat exhaustion include headaches, cool and clammy skin, dizziness, fatigue, nausea, thirst, and rapid pulse. The best treatment is resting with feet elevated, replenishing fluids, and removing excess clothing.

Common symptoms of heat stroke can be an altered state of mind, rapid pulse and respiratory rate, headache, hot skin, loss of coordination, and possible seizures. This is a life threatening illness that must be dealt with right away. While mountaineering, snow and ice can be used to cool the body and head.

Cold Related Conditions 
In certain environmental conditions body heat can be lost due to evaporation, radiation, convection, and conduction. A cold related illness can occur when that body heat is lost.

Problems that can arise from the cold include windchill, hypothermia, frost nip, frost bite, or immersion foot.

The best treatment for hypothermia is to deal with it before it occurs, using preventative measures instead of waiting for symptoms to appear. Mountaineering requires a slower pace to avoid sweating and fatigue that could lead to these dangerous conditions. Other tips for preventing hypothermia include staying well fed and hydrated, putting on more clothes when feeling cold, and wearing adequate equipment to keep warm and dry.

Styles of mountaineering

There are two main styles of mountaineering: expedition style and alpine style.

Expedition style
The alpine style contrasts with "expedition style". With this style, climbers will carry large amounts of equipment and provisions up and down the mountain, slowly making upward progress. Climbing in an expedition style is preferred if the summit is very high or distant from civilization. Mountaineers who use this style are usually, but not always, part of a large team of climbers and support staff (such as porters and guides). To cover large distances with their massive amounts of gear, sleds and pack animals are commonly used. Climbers will set up multiple camps along the mountain, and will haul their gear up the mountain multiple times, returning to a lower camp after each haul until all the gear is at a higher camp; and repeating this procedure until they reach the summit. This technique is also helpful for acclimatization. While it is the original style in which high mountains were climbed, expedition style is rare these days as more mountains have become accessible to the general public with air travel and the penetration of highways into mountainous regions. It is still common in ranges such as the Alaska Range and the Himalayas.

 Uses multiple trips between camps to carry supplies up to higher camps
 Group sizes are often larger than alpine style climbs because more supplies are carried between camps.
 Fixed lines are often used to minimize the danger involved in continually moving between camps.
 For the highest mountains, supplemental oxygen is frequently used.
 There is a higher margin of safety in relation to equipment, food, time, and ability to wait out storms at high camps.
 Avoidance of being trapped in storms at high altitudes and being forced to descend in treacherous avalanche conditions
 Possible higher exposure to objective hazards such as avalanches or rockfall, due to slower travel times between camps
 Higher capital expenditures and a longer time scale

Alpine style

Alpine style, or informal variations of it, is the most common form of mountaineering today. It involves a single, straightforward climb of the mountain, with no backtracking. Alpine style ascents have been done throughout history on extreme altitude (above 5,000 m) peaks also, albeit in lower volume to expedition style ascents. Climbers generally carry their loads between camps without backtracking, in a single push for the summit. If the summit is reachable from the base camp or trailhead within one day, then alpine-style mountaineers will not change camps at all, and only carry the slightest of loads (necessary nourishment and equipment) up to the summit. "Light and fast" is the mantra of the alpine mountaineer.

 Climbers climb the route only once because they do not continually climb up and down to stock camps with supplies.
 Fewer supplies are used on the climb, therefore fewer personnel are needed.
 Alpine-style ascents do not leave the climber exposed to objective hazards as long as an expedition-style climb does; however, because of the speed of the ascent relative to an expedition-style climb there is less time for acclimatization.
 For the highest mountains, supplemental oxygen is rarely used, or used more sparingly.
 Danger of being trapped at high altitude due to storms, potentially being exposed to HAPE or HACE
 Lower capital expenditures and a shorter time scale

See also

 Exploration of the High Alps
 Glossary of climbing terms
 Hazards in the Rocky Mountains
 Highest unclimbed mountain
 Index of climbing topics
 Lead climbing
 List of climbers and mountaineers
 List of deaths on eight-thousanders
 List of first ascents
 List of mountaineering equipment brands
 Mountain film
 Mountain rescue
 Mountaineering: The Freedom of the Hills
 Peak bagging
 Ski mountaineering
 Snow goggles
 Piolet d'Or
 Snow Leopard award
 World altitude record (mountaineering)
 National Outdoor Leadership School

References

Further reading

External links 

 A Climber's Glossary
 Military Mountaineering, Army Field Manual FM 3–97.61 (Aug 2002) pdf
 International Mountaineering and Climbing Federation (UIAA) – official organisation of mountaineering and climbing recognised by International Olympic Committee

 Climbing the clouds – virtual exhibit of British Columbia mountaineering